The 2018 Paddy Power Champions League of Darts was the 3rd annual staging of the tournament, organised by the Professional Darts Corporation. It took place from 22–23 September 2018 at the Brighton Centre, Brighton.

The defending champion Mensur Suljović lost 4–11 against Gary Anderson in the semi-final; a rematch of the 2017 final.

Anderson went on to win his first Champions League title by defeating compatriot Peter Wright 11–4 in the final. It was Anderson's 10th major title and 8th in the PDC. It was also Anderson's 3rd major title of the season after winning that year's UK Open and World Matchplay.

A noticeable controversy was the walk-ons before the group match between Simon Whitlock and Peter Wright, where Wright's walk-on music, "Don't Stop the Party" by Pitbull, was played when Whitlock walked onto the stage, instead of his own track, "Down Under" by Men at Work. Whitlock performed Wright's renowned sidestep dance across the stage, causing much laughter on stage and in the crowd. Wright subsequently walked on to his own music, and the Pitbull track was played twice.

Format
The eight qualifiers were split into two groups, playing each other once in a best of 19 legs match. The top two of each group then proceed to the semi-finals. Both semi-finals and the final were a best of 21 legs match.

Prize money

Qualifiers
The top 7 players on the PDC Order of Merit following the 2018 World Matchplay qualified. Reigning champion Mensur Suljović was given a guaranteed place in the tournament, as he is the defending champion. As Suljović was also one of the top 7 players, the eighth ranked player also qualified.

  Michael van Gerwen (semi-finals)
  Peter Wright (runner-up)
  Rob Cross (group stage)
  Gary Anderson (winner)
  Daryl Gurney (group stage)
  Mensur Suljović (semi-finals)
  Simon Whitlock (group stage)
  Dave Chisnall (group stage)

Results

Group stage

All matches first-to-10 (best of 19 legs)

NB: P = Played; W = Won; L = Lost; LF = Legs for; LA = Legs against; +/− = Plus/minus record, in relation to legs; Avg = Three-dart average in group matches; Pts = Group points

Group A

22 September

22 September

23 September

Group B

22 September

22 September

23 September

Knockout stage

References

Champions League of Darts
Champions League of Darts
2018 in English sport
Sport in Brighton and Hove
Champions League of Darts